Tskhinvali or Tskhinval is the capital of the disputed de facto independent Republic of South Ossetia, internationally considered part of Shida Kartli, Georgia (except by the Russian Federation and four other UN member states), and previously the capital of the erstwhile Soviet Georgian South Ossetian Autonomous Oblast.

Name
The name of Tskhinvali is derived from the Old Georgian Krtskhinvali, from earlier Krtskhilvani, literally meaning "the land of hornbeams", which is the historical name of the city. See ცხინვალი for more.

From 1934 to 1961, the city was named Staliniri, which was compilation of Joseph Stalin's surname with Ossetian word "Ir" which means Ossetia. Modern Ossetians call the city Tskhinval (leaving off the final "i", which is a nominative case ending in Georgian); the other Ossetian name of the city is Chreba which is only spread as a colloquial word.

History
The area around the present-day Tskhinvali was first populated back in the Bronze Age. The unearthed settlements and archaeological artifacts from that time are unique in that they reflect influences from both Iberian (east Georgia) and Colchian (west Georgia) cultures with possible Sarmatian elements.

Tskhinvali was first chronicled by Georgian sources in 1398 as a village in Kartli (central Georgia) though a later account credits the 3rd century AD Georgian king Aspacures II of Iberia with its foundation as a fortress. By the early 18th century, Tskhinvali was a small "royal town" populated chiefly by monastic serfs. Tskhinvali was annexed to the Russian Empire along with the rest of eastern Georgia in 1801. Located on a trade route which linked North Caucasus to Tbilisi and Gori, Tskhinvali gradually developed into a commercial town with a mixed Georgian Jewish, Georgian, Armenian and Ossetian population. In 1917, it had 600 houses with 38.4% Georgian Jews, 34.4% Georgians, 17.7% Armenians and 8.8% Ossetians.

The town saw clashes between Georgian People's Guard and pro-Bolshevik Ossetian peasants during the 1918–20 period, when Georgia gained brief independence from Russia. Soviet rule was established by the invading Red Army in March 1921, and a year later, in 1922, Tskhinvali was made a capital of the South Ossetian Autonomous Oblast within the Georgian SSR. Subsequently, the town became largely Ossetian due to intense urbanisation and Soviet Korenizatsiya ("nativization") policy which induced an inflow of the Ossetians from the nearby rural areas into Tskhinvali. It was essentially an industrial centre, with lumber mills and manufacturing plants, and had also several cultural and educational institutions such as a venerated Pedagogical Institute (currently Tskhinvali State University) and a drama theatre. According to the last Soviet census (in 1989), Tskhinvali had a population of 42,934, and according to the census of Republic of South Ossetia in 2015, the population was 30,432 people.

During the acute phase of the Georgian-Ossetian conflict, Tskhinvali was a scene of ethnic tensions and ensuing armed confrontation between Georgian and Ossetian forces. The 1992 Sochi ceasefire accord left Tskhinvali in the hands of Ossetians.

Russo-Georgian War

A considerable part of the population of South Ossetia (at least, 30,000 out of 70,000) fled into North Ossetia–Alania prior or immediately after the start of the 2008 war. However, many civilians were killed during the shelling and the following Battle of Tskhinvali (162 civilian deaths were documented by the Russian team of investigators and 365 – by the South Ossetian authorities). The town was heavily damaged during the battle. Andrey Illarionov visited the town in October 2008, and reported that Jewish Quarter indeed was in ruins, though he observed that the ruins were overgrown with shrubs and trees, which indicates that the destruction took place during the 1991–1992 South Ossetia War. However, Mark Ames, who was covering the last war for The Nation, stated that Tskhinvali's main residential district, nicknamed Shanghai because of its population density (it's where most of the city's high-rise apartment blocks are located), and the old Jewish Quarter, were completely destroyed.

Geography

Climate 
Summers are mild and winters are cold, with snowfalls.

Present

Currently, Tskhinvali functions as the capital of South Ossetia. Before the 2008 war it had a population of approximately 30,000. The town remained significantly impoverished in the absence of a permanent political settlement between the two sides in the past two decades.

The city contains several monuments of medieval Georgian architecture, with the Kavti Church of St. George being the oldest one dating back to the 8th–10th centuries.

On August 21, 2008, a world-known Russian conductor and director of the Mariinsky Theatre, of Ossetian origin, Valery Gergiev conducted a concert near the ruined building of South Ossetian parliament in memory of the victims of the war in South Ossetia.

Transport
There was a railway service before 1991 at the Tskhinvali Railway station connecting the city with Gori.

International relations

Twin towns and Sister cities
Tskhinvali is twinned with the following cities:
Arkhangelsk, Russia
 Vladivostok, Russia

Notable people
 Mamed Aghaev, former professional wrestler representing Armenia
 David Baazov, founder of the Zionist movement in Georgia
 Kakhi Kakhiashvili, Olympic Champion weightlifter
 Arsen Kasabiev, weightlifter
 Vadim Laliev, former professional wrestler representing Armenia and Russia

See also
 Shida Kartli
 Samachablo

Notes

External links

Sites
 Site of Tskhinvali: information, news, video, photos, etc. – www.chinval.ru

Pictures
 Casualties in South Ossetia from Human Rights Watch
 Tskhinvali after the war from RIA Novosti
 13 Aug 2008: Pictures of destroyed Tskhinvali after shelling of the city by Georgian troops on 8 Aug 2008 from Osinform
 "Kvartals old Tskhinval (photo)"(«Кварталы старого Цхинвала (фото)») – OSinform.ru

References

 
Populated places in South Ossetia
Cities and towns in Shida Kartli
Tiflis Governorate
De-Stalinization
1398 establishments
Populated places established in the 1390s
1398 establishments in Europe